The Pope-Toledo was the luxury marque of the Pope Motor Car Company founded by Colonel Albert A. Pope, and was a manufacturer of Brass Era automobiles in Toledo, Ohio between 1903 and 1909.  The Pope-Toledo was the successor to the Toledo of the International Motor Car Company.

History
The 1903 Pope-Toledo was a four-wheel, front-engined, two-seater open car. It was powered by a straight 3 cylinder 182 cubic inch (2983 cc) engine with the then unusual feature of a detachable cylinder head. Valve operation was mechanical and the engine speed was governed at 600 RPM. Drive was through a 3-speed gearbox with chains to each rear wheel. The chassis was mainly wood with a steel sub-frame carrying the main mechanical components. It was entered in the first Vanderbilt Cup (1904), but lost its steering and hit a tree.

The 1904 model was a larger touring car. Equipped with a rear entrance tonneau body, it could seat 5 passengers and sold for $3,500, . The vertically mounted water-cooled straight-4, situated at the front of the car, produced 24hp (17.9kW). A 3-speed sliding transmission was fitted. The channel steel-framed car weighed 2350lb (1066kg). This modern Système Panhard car had spark and throttle levers on steering wheel, a novelty at the time.

In 1905, a Pope-Toledo owned by C. Edward Born was driven 828.5 miles before a crowd of 15,000 to win the world's first 24-hour endurance race in Columbus, Ohio. Piloted by brothers George and Charles Soules, the car was protested by runners up as being a special factory-owned "ringer". This protest was rejected by the Columbus Driving Park officials. In 1908, Bobby Sheldon brought a 1906 Pope-Toledo down the Yukon to Fairbanks, the first car brought to Alaska.

By 1907 the company models included limousines and seven seat cars.   In 1909 the company was taken over by Richard D. Apperson of the American National Bank of Lynchburg, Virginia (and no relation to Apperson of Kokomo).  The Apperson deal failed and the Pope Motor Car Company receivers sold the factory to Overland.

Gallery

See also
 Frank Leslie's Popular Monthly (January, 1904)
 Pope-Toledo at ConceptCarz
 Fountainhead Museum - The Toledo - "An Automobile of Quality"
 Toledos Attic Article - Toledos early automobiles  
 Bonhams - 1906 Pope-Toledo
 Bonhams - 1904 Pope-Toledo

References

Motor vehicle manufacturers based in Ohio
Defunct motor vehicle manufacturers of the United States
Luxury motor vehicle manufacturers
Defunct companies based in Ohio
Vehicle manufacturing companies established in 1903
Vehicle manufacturing companies disestablished in 1909
Luxury vehicles
Veteran vehicles
Brass Era vehicles
1900s cars
Cars introduced in 1903